Musa itinerans, the Yunnan banana, is a species of banana. The tender inner stalk is also harvested and eaten. It is the landmark 24,200th plant species saved at Kew Gardens' Millennium Seed Bank Project. With this addition the seed bank has collected 10% of the world’s wild plant species. In China it is an important food for wild Asian elephants.

References

External links 
Flora of China

itinerans
Flora of China
Flora of Taiwan
Flora of Arunachal Pradesh
Flora of Assam (region)
Flora of Indo-China